Elections to Tamworth Borough Council were held on 4 May 2006. One third of the council was up for election and the Conservative Party stayed in overall control of the council. Overall turnout was 32.3%

After the election, the composition of the council was:
Conservative 21
Labour 8
Independent 1

Election result

Ward results

References
2006 Tamworth election result
Ward results

2006
2006 English local elections
2000s in Staffordshire